John Tipper may refer to
John Tipper (mathematician) (1616–1713), English mathematician
John Tipper (speed skater) (born 1944), English Olympic speedskater